Michael Sarnoski is an American film director and screenwriter who made his directorial debut with the 2021 film Pig, starring Nicolas Cage, Alex Wolff, and Adam Arkin. He wrote the screenplay, based on a story by himself and producer Vanessa Block, with whom he attended Yale University. In 2015, he executive produced and edited Block's short film The Testimony. In January 2022, it was announced that Sarnoski will be writing and directing A Quiet Place: Day One for Paramount.

Sarnoski grew up in Milwaukee, and graduated from the University School of Milwaukee before attending Yale.

Filmography

References

External links 

Living people
21st-century American male writers
21st-century American screenwriters
American male screenwriters
Film directors from Wisconsin
Filmmakers from Milwaukee
Screenwriters from Wisconsin
University School of Milwaukee alumni
Yale University alumni
Writers from Milwaukee
Year of birth missing (living people)